Carlos Irwin Estévez (born September 3, 1965), known professionally as Charlie Sheen, is an American actor. He has appeared in films such as Platoon (1986), Wall Street (1987), Young Guns (1988), The Rookie (1990), The Three Musketeers (1993), and The Arrival (1996). In the 2000s, when Sheen replaced Michael J. Fox as the star of ABC's Spin City, his portrayal of Charlie Crawford earned him a Golden Globe Award for Best Actor. He then starred as Charlie Harper on the CBS sitcom Two and a Half Men (2003–11), for which he received multiple Golden Globe and Primetime Emmy nominations, and as Dr. Charles "Charlie" Goodson on the FX series Anger Management (2012–14). In 2010, Sheen was the highest-paid actor on television, earning US$1.8 million per episode of Two and a Half Men.

Sheen's personal life has made headlines, including reports of alcohol and drug abuse and marital problems, as well as allegations of domestic violence. In March 2011, his contract for Two and a Half Men was terminated by CBS and Warner Bros. following his derogatory comments about the series' creator, Chuck Lorre. On November 17, 2015, Sheen publicly revealed that he is HIV positive, having been diagnosed four years previously. The disclosure resulted in a vast increase of online search queries for HIV prevention and testing, which was later dubbed the "Charlie Sheen effect".

Early life
Sheen was born Carlos Estévez on September 3, 1965, in New York City, the youngest son of actor Martin Sheen (whose real name is Ramón Estévez) and artist Janet Templeton. His paternal grandparents were emigrants from Galicia (Spain) and Ireland, respectively. Sheen said in 2011 that his father was Catholic and his mother was Southern Baptist. He has two older brothers, Emilio and Ramon, and a younger sister, Renée, all actors. His parents moved to Malibu, California, after Martin's Broadway turn in The Subject Was Roses. Sheen's first movie appearance was at age nine in his father's 1974 film The Execution of Private Slovik. Sheen attended Santa Monica High School in Santa Monica, California, along with Robert Downey Jr., where he was a star pitcher and shortstop for the baseball team.

At Santa Monica High School, he showed an early interest in acting, making amateur Super 8 films with his brother Emilio and school friends Rob Lowe and Sean Penn under his birth name. A few weeks before graduation, Sheen was expelled from school for poor grades and attendance. Deciding to become an actor, he took the stage name Charlie Sheen. His father had adopted the surname Sheen in honor of the Catholic archbishop and theologian Fulton J. Sheen, while Charlie was an English form of his given name Carlos.

Acting career

Film
Sheen's film career began in 1983, when he was cast to portray Ron in Grizzly II: The Predator, the sequel to the 1976 low budget horror movie Grizzly, which remained unreleased until 2020. In 1984, he had a role in the Cold War teen drama Red Dawn with Patrick Swayze, C. Thomas Howell, Lea Thompson, and Jennifer Grey. Sheen and Grey reunited in a small scene in Ferris Bueller's Day Off (1986). He also appeared in an episode of the anthology series Amazing Stories. Sheen had his first major role in the Vietnam War drama Platoon (1986). In 1987, he starred with his father in Wall Street. Both Wall Street and Platoon were directed by Oliver Stone. In 1988, Stone asked Sheen to star in his new film Born on the Fourth of July (1989) but later cast Tom Cruise instead. Sheen was never notified by Stone, and he only found out when he heard the news from his brother Emilio. Sheen did not take a lead role in Stone's subsequent films, although he did have a cameo role in Money Never Sleeps.

In 1988, he starred in the baseball film Eight Men Out as outfielder Happy Felsch. Also in 1988, he appeared opposite his brother Emilio in Young Guns and again in 1990 in Men at Work. In 1989, Sheen, John Fusco, Christopher Cain, Lou Diamond Phillips, Emilio Estévez and Kiefer Sutherland were honored with a Bronze Wrangler for their work on the film Young Guns.

In 1990, he starred alongside his father in Cadence as a rebellious inmate in a military stockade and with Clint Eastwood in the buddy cop film The Rookie. The films were directed by Martin Sheen and Eastwood, respectively. In 1992, he featured in Beyond the Law with Linda Fiorentino and Michael Madsen. In 1994, Sheen was given a star on the Hollywood Walk of Fame. In 1997, Sheen wrote his first movie, Discovery Mars, a direct-to-video documentary revolving around the question, "Is There Life on Mars?". The next year, Sheen wrote, produced and starred in the action movie No Code of Conduct.

Sheen appeared in several comedy roles, including the Major League films, Money Talks, and the spoof Hot Shots! films. In 1999, Sheen appeared in a pilot for A&E Network, called Sugar Hill, which was not picked up. In 1999, Sheen played himself in Being John Malkovich. He also appeared in the third, fourth and fifth entries in the popular horror-spoof series Scary Movie.

Sheen has also done voices for animation, appearing as Charlie in All Dogs Go To Heaven 2 (replacing Burt Reynolds), as well as Dex Dogtective in the Lionsgate animated comedy Foodfight.

In 2012, Sheen was cast to star alongside Jason Schwartzman and Bill Murray in Roman Coppola's surreal comedy film A Glimpse Inside the Mind of Charles Swan III.

For the 2013 film Machete Kills, in which Sheen played the President of the United States, he was credited under his birth name Carlos Estévez. It was a one-time move due to the film's Hispanic theme; it was Sheen's idea to use his birth name for the film. The trailer and opening credits for the film used an "and introducing..." tag when showing Sheen's birth name.

Sheen's next feature film project was the ensemble film 9/11 (2017), an adaptation of the 9/11 stage play Elevator written by Patrick Carson. The film also featured Whoopi Goldberg, Gina Gershon, Luis Guzmán, Wood Harris, Jacqueline Bisset and Bruce Davison.

Television

In 2000, Sheen debuted on the small screen when he replaced Michael J. Fox for the last two seasons of the sitcom Spin City (which also had fellow Ferris Bueller actor Alan Ruck as Stuart Bondek). For his work on Spin City, Sheen was nominated for two ALMA Awards and won his first Golden Globe for Best Performance by an Actor in a Television Series – Musical or Comedy. The series ended in 2002.

In 2003, Sheen was cast as Charlie Harper in the CBS sitcom Two and a Half Men, which followed the popular Monday night time slot of Everybody Loves Raymond. Sheen's role on Two and a Half Men was loosely based on Sheen's bad boy image. The role garnered him an ALMA Award and he gained three Emmy Award nominations and two Golden Globe award nominations. During his eighth and final season on the show, Sheen earned $1.8 million per episode.

Warner Bros. dismissal
Production of Two and a Half Men went on hiatus in January 2011 while Sheen underwent a substance rehabilitation program in his home, his third attempt at rehab in 12 months. The following month, CBS canceled the season's four remaining episodes after Sheen publicly made offensive comments about the series's creator, Chuck Lorre, and Warner Bros. banned Sheen from entering its production lot. Sheen, already the highest-paid actor on television, responded by publicly demanding a 50 percent raise, claiming that in comparison to the amount that the series was making, he was "underpaid".

CBS and Warner Bros. terminated Sheen's contract on March 7, 2011. He was replaced by Ashton Kutcher. In the aftermath of his dismissal, Sheen continued to feud with Chuck Lorre, and filed a wrongful termination lawsuit against Lorre and Warner Bros., which was settled the following September 26. That same month, Sheen, while presenting an award at the Primetime Emmy Awards, addressed "everybody here from Two and a Half Men" and stated, "From the bottom of my heart, I wish you nothing but the best for this upcoming season. We spent eight wonderful years together and I know you will continue to make great television." In 2012, Sheen returned to television in Anger Management, the spin-off of the film of the same name. The series ended after a 100-episode run in the second season.

Publicity following dismissal
In the wake of the dismissal, Sheen had a highly publicized meltdown which was broadcast on television and the Internet. He made claims in television interviews suggesting that he was a "warlock" with "tiger blood" and "Adonis DNA", and that he was "winning". He also posted videos to YouTube showing himself smoking cigarettes through his nose, and cursing out his former employers. He told one TV interviewer, "I'm tired of pretending I'm not special. I'm tired of pretending I'm not a total bitchin' rock star from Mars." After being accused of antisemitism in 2011, Sheen claimed that his mother was Jewish, although Jewish Standard reporter Nate Bloom wrote that he found no evidence to support this and described Sheen's claim as "exceedingly unlikely". Sheen said later that year that his father was Catholic and his mother was Southern Baptist.

Other
On September 19, 2011, Sheen was roasted on Comedy Central. It was watched by 6.4 million people, making it the highest rated roast on Comedy Central to date.

Also that year, he played a role in the hip hop music video "Steak & Mash Potatoes" by Chain Swangaz featuring Brother Marquis. The video features both rappers as fast food employee who create havoc while their boss (Sheen) is gone.

In October 2018, Sheen flew to Australia for his "An Evening with Charlie Sheen" tour. During this time he filmed an advert for car servicing company Ultra Tune which was the next installment in their controversial "Unexpected Situations" series alongside Parnia Porsche, Laura Lydall, Tyana Hansen and Imogen Lovell.

Other ventures

In 2006, Sheen launched a clothing line for children, called Sheen Kidz. In 2011, Sheen set a Guinness World Record for Twitter as the "Fastest Time to Reach 1 Million Followers" (adding an average of 129,000 new followers per day) as well as the Guinness record for "Highest Paid TV Actor Per Episode – Current" at $1.25 million while he was a part of the cast of Two and a Half Men sitcom. On March 3, 2011, Sheen signed with Ad.ly marketing agency specializing in Twitter and Facebook promotions.

On March 10, 2011, Sheen announced a nationwide tour, "My Violent Torpedo of Truth/Defeat is Not An Option", which began in Detroit on April 2. The tour sold out in 18 minutes, a Ticketmaster record. However, on April 1, 2011, the Detroit Free Press featured an article that stated as of March 30 that there were over 1000 tickets available from a third-party reseller, some at 15% less than the cheapest seats sold at the Fox Theater. The Huffington Post reported that it was expected Sheen would earn $1 million in 2011 from Twitter endorsements and $7 million from the North American tour. Many of those attending the performance of April 2 in Detroit found it disappointing; the subsequent performance in Chicago, which featured some adjustments, received a more positive reception.

Sheen was announced as the face of and partner in "NicoSheen", a line of disposable E-cigarettes and related products.

On August 13, 2011, Sheen hosted at the 12th annual Gathering of the Juggalos, an event created by the Insane Clown Posse. He received a mixed reaction from the audience, but has expressed appreciation for the culture by describing himself as a Juggalo and wearing a baseball cap featuring the Psychopathic Records logo in public and during production meetings for Anger Management.

Personal life

Family and relationships

Sheen has been married three times. He has five children and one grandchild.

His oldest daughter is from a previous relationship with his former high school girlfriend, Paula Profit, whose name has also been given as Paula Speert. Through his oldest daughter, Cassandra Estevez, Sheen has one granddaughter, named Luna.

In January 1990, Sheen accidentally shot his fiancée, Kelly Preston, in the arm. She broke off the engagement soon after. In the 1990s, Sheen subsequently dated a number of adult film actresses, including Ginger Lynn and Heather Hunter.

On September 3, 1995, Sheen married his first wife, Donna Peele. That same year, Sheen was named as one of the clients of an escort agency operated by Heidi Fleiss. Sheen and Peele divorced in 1996.

Sheen met actress Denise Richards on the set of Good Advice in 2000. They began dating in October 2001, when Richards guest-starred on Sheen's TV show Spin City. They became engaged on December 26, 2001, and married on June 15, 2002, at the estate of Spin City creator Gary David Goldberg. They have two daughters together (born in 2004 and 2005). In March 2005, Richards filed for divorce, accusing Sheen of alcohol and drug abuse and threats of violence as well as accusations of Sheen looking at gay pornography featuring "boys who looked underage" and being "attracted" to underage girls. Sheen would later deny these claims, and stated that the FBI was "aware" of the allegations and had searched his computers. The divorce was finalized in November 2006 and preceded a custody dispute over their two daughters.

On May 30, 2008, Sheen married his third wife, Brooke Mueller and had twin sons. In November 2010, Sheen filed for divorce. On March 1, 2011, police removed the couple's sons from Sheen's home. Sheen told NBC's Today, "I stayed very calm and focused." According to People, social services took the children after Mueller obtained a restraining order against Sheen. The document said, "I am very concerned that [Sheen] is currently insane." Asked if he would fight for the children, Sheen texted People, "Born ready. Winning." Sheen and Mueller's divorce became final on May 2, 2011.

On March 1, 2011, Sheen was concurrently living with 24-year old pornographic actress Bree Olson and 24-year old model and graphic designer Natalie Kenly, whom he collectively nicknamed his "goddesses". Olson left Sheen in April 2011, and Kenly left in June 2011. In a January 2013 interview on Piers Morgan Tonight, Sheen stated that he was in a relationship with adult film actress and 2011 Penthouse magazine Pet of the Month Georgia Jones.

Then, in February 2014, Sheen became engaged to former adult film star Brett Rossi, who began going by her real name, Scottine. With a wedding planned for November 2014, the engagement was broken off in October with an announcement that the two had "mutually decided" to separate. Sheen stated, "I've decided that my children deserve my focus more than a relationship does right now. I still have a tremendous fondness for Scotty and I wish her all the best." A month later it was reported that Rossi was hospitalized for an apparent drug overdose. In 2015, Rossi sued Sheen after his announcement of being HIV positive and for various other allegations such as "assault and battery, emotional distress, false imprisonment and negligence".

In June 2022, Sheen's second daughter, Sami, created an OnlyFans account. Sheen initially disapproved of the action. He later changed his mind citing points made by her mother.

Residences
For many years Sheen resided in Beverly Hills, California. However, he sold his property for $6.6 million in 2020. As of 2022, Sheen resides in a rented house in Malibu, California.

Substance abuse, legal issues and health
On May 20, 1998, Sheen suffered a stroke after overdosing while using cocaine and was hospitalized. Sheen was found in his seaside home by a friend, after which paramedics rushed him to Los Robles Hospital & Medical Center in Thousand Oaks, California. He was described as being in "serious condition" after his stomach was pumped. Days later, Sheen checked into a rehab clinic, then told doctors that he did not intend to stay. Sheen left, then Sheriffs forced Sheen back to the clinic. On August 11, 1998, Sheen, already on probation in California for a previous drug offense, had his probation extended by one year and entered a rehab clinic. In a 2004 interview, Sheen disclosed that his previous overdose was caused by injecting cocaine.

On December 25, 2009, Sheen was arrested for assaulting his wife at the time, Brooke Mueller, in Aspen, Colorado. He was released the same day from jail after posting an $8,500 bond. Sheen was charged with felony menacing, as well as third-degree assault and criminal mischief. On August 2, 2010, Sheen, represented by Yale Galanter, pleaded guilty to misdemeanor assault as part of a plea bargain that included dismissal of the other charges against him. Sheen was sentenced to 30 days in a drug rehab center, 30 days of probation, and 36 hours of anger management.

On October 26, 2010, the police removed Sheen from his suite at the Plaza Hotel after he reportedly caused $7,000 in damage. According to the NYPD, Sheen admitted to drinking and using cocaine the night of the incident. He was released after entering a hospital for observation.

On November 17, 2015, Sheen publicly revealed that he was HIV positive, having been diagnosed roughly four years earlier. In an interview, he referred to the acronym HIV as "three hard letters to absorb". He manages his condition with a triple cocktail of antiretroviral drugs, and said that it was impossible that he could have infected any of his partners. Sheen noted that since 2011, he had paid extortionists approximately $10 million to keep his HIV status secret. Sheen stated that he was upfront about his HIV positive condition with all of his past partners.

In an episode of The Dr. Oz Show taped in late 2015 and aired January 12, 2016, Sheen stated that he had "been off [his] meds for about a week now," receiving alternative treatment in Mexico from Sam Chachoua, who claims to have an effective vaccine for HIV; according to his manager, however, after the episode was taped he resumed taking his medications.

In April 2016, Sheen had his monthly child support payments to his two ex-wives, Richards and Mueller, reduced from $55,000 to $10,000. The same month, it was announced that Sheen was under investigation by the LAPD stalking unit for threatening to kill his former fiancée Scottine Ross.

Allegations of sexual assault
In 2017, Sheen sued the National Enquirer over a story alleging that, in 1986, he raped his 13-year-old co-star Corey Haim on the set of Lucas. The case was settled in 2018. Haim's mother, Judy Haim, identified a different actor as her son's rapist on The Dr. Oz Show, and told Entertainment Tonight that Sheen never raped her son, calling the claims "made up".

In March 2020, actor Corey Feldman repeated the claim that Sheen raped Haim in his documentary (My) Truth: The Rape of Two Coreys, corroborated by Feldman's ex-wife Susie Feldman and his Lost Boys co-star Jamison Newlander. Sheen, through his publicist, denied the allegations, calling them "sick, twisted and outlandish".

Activism

The Charlie Sheen effect
Sheen's HIV-positive disclosure corresponded with the greatest number of HIV-related Google searches ever recorded in the United States. During the three weeks following his disclosure, there were about 2.75 million more searches than expected that included the term HIV, and 1.25 million searches were directly relevant to public-health outcomes because they included search terms for condoms, HIV symptoms, or HIV testing (e.g., "get HIV tested").

A later study found Sheen's disclosure corresponded with a 95% increase in over-the-counter at-home HIV testing kits.

The study's authors dubbed it "The Charlie Sheen Effect" with commenters noting "Charlie Sheen did more for HIV education than most UN events do." Sheen spoke out for HIV prevention, citing the studies as motivation, later adding he was "humbled" to "be of service."

Charity work
Sheen was the 2004 spokesperson for the Lee National Denim Day breast cancer fundraiser that raised millions of dollars for research and education regarding the disease. Sheen stated that a friend of his died from breast cancer, and he wanted to try to help find a cure for the disease.

A major donor and supporter of Aid For AIDS since 2006, Sheen was honored with an AFA Angel Award, one of only a few ever given, at the nonprofit's 25th Silver Anniversary Reception in 2009. In addition to his financial support, he has volunteered to act as a celebrity judge for several years for their annual fundraiser, Best In Drag Show, which raises around a quarter of a million dollars each year in Los Angeles for AIDS assistance.
He has brought other celebrities to support the event, including his father, actor Martin Sheen. Sheen's interest in AIDS was first reported in 1987 with his support of Ryan White, an Indiana teenager who became a national spokesperson for AIDS awareness after being infected with AIDS through a blood transfusion for his hemophilia.

On March 27, 2008, Sheen and Jenna Elfman co-hosted the Scientology-affiliated New York Rescue Workers Detoxification Project charity event.

Sheen donated one dollar from each ticket sold from his "My Violent Torpedo of Truth/Defeat is Not An Option Show" 2011 tour to the Red Cross Japanese earthquake Relief Fund.

In 2011, Sheen took on a Twitter challenge by a grieving mother to help critically ill babies born with congenital diaphragmatic hernia by supporting CHERUBS – The Association of Congenital Diaphragmatic Hernia Research, Awareness and Support.

Sheen, a lifelong fan of the Cincinnati Reds, announced in August 2012 that he would donate $50,000 to the team's community fund, which supports various charities. The donation came after the team raised another $50,000 in an attempt to get sportscaster Marty Brennaman to shave his head on the field after a Reds victory. After Brennaman shaved his head, Sheen offered to match the previous donation total.

Opinions

Political views
In a 2015 interview, Sheen described himself as a "constitutional Republican". Sheen discussed his desire of running for U.S. President in 2016.

Sheen has been publicly scathing against former President Donald Trump. He has labelled Trump a "charlatan" and wished death upon him.

September 11 attacks
Sheen is an outspoken advocate of the 9/11 truth movement. On September 8, 2009, he appealed to President Barack Obama to set up a new investigation into the attacks. Presenting his views as a transcript of a fictional encounter with Obama, he was characterized by the press as believing the 9/11 Commission was a whitewash and that the administration of former President George W. Bush may have been responsible for the attacks.

Anti-vaccination
Sheen is staunchly opposed to vaccinations. After separating from Denise Richards, he sent a legal notice to his daughters' physician stating his lack of consent to vaccinate them. The dispute over vaccines seems to have played an important role in the failure of the marriage. Richards said in an interview in 2008, "When I vaccinated Sam, he accused me of poisoning her. And I knew when he said that that the marriage wasn't going to work."

Filmography

Film

Television

Music videos

See also
 List of awards and nominations received by Charlie Sheen

References

External links

1965 births
20th-century American male actors
21st-century American male actors
9/11 conspiracy theorists
American activists
American conspiracy theorists
American male child actors
American male film actors
American people of Spanish descent
American people convicted of assault
American people of Galician descent
American people of Irish descent
American male television actors
American male voice actors
Best Musical or Comedy Actor Golden Globe (television) winners
California Republicans
Estevez family
Hispanic and Latino American male actors
Living people
Male actors from New York City
Male actors from Santa Monica, California
New York (state) Republicans
People with HIV/AIDS